Zodarion beticum is a spider species found in Spain.

See also
 List of Zodariidae species

References

External links

beticum
Spiders of Europe
Spiders described in 1957